WQLI (92.3 FM) is a radio station broadcasting an adult contemporary format.  Licensed to Meigs, Georgia, United States, the station is currently owned by Kevin L. Dowdy, through licensee Flint Media, Inc., and features programming from ABC Radio .

References

External links

QLI